Robert Thompson Clubb is an American scientist. He a professor of chemistry, biochemistry, and molecular biology at University of California, Los Angeles.

Early life and education 
Robert Thompson Clubb was born to surgical nurse Vera Alice Thompson of Yakima, Washington and Jerome M. Clubb a professor of history. Clubb has a sister. He earned a bachelor of science at University of Wisconsin. He completed a doctor of philosophy in biological chemistry at University of Michigan. His 1993 dissertation was titled Application and development of multi-dimensional NMR spectroscopic techniques to study protein structure in solution. Clubb's advisors and co-chairs of his thesis committee were Gerhard Wagner and Martha L. Ludwig. He received training in practical nuclear magnetic resonance spectroscopy from Venkataraman Thanabal. From 1993 to 1996, Clubb was a post-doctoral research fellow at the National Institutes of Health. His advisors were G. Marius Clore and Angela Gronenborn.

Career 
Clubb is a professor of chemistry, biochemistry, and molecular biology at University of California, Los Angeles. He is the lab director of the Clubb Lab and co-director and staff researcher at the Nuclear Magnetic Resonance (NMR) Core Technology Center (DOE).

Personal life 
Clubb is married to Joanna Hoffman Clubb. They reside in Culver City, California.

References 

Living people
Year of birth missing (living people)
University of Wisconsin–Madison alumni
University of Michigan alumni
University of California, Los Angeles faculty
20th-century American scientists
21st-century American scientists